The Kyiv City Committee of the Communist Party of Ukraine, commonly referred to as the Kyiv CPU gorkom, was the position of highest authority in the city of Kyiv.

The position was created in 1921, and abolished in August 1991 although most authority was lost in June that year to the position of Mayor of Kyiv. The First Secretary was a de facto appointed position usually by the Central Committee of the Communist Party of Ukraine or the First Secretary of the Communist Party of Ukraine. The First Secretary exercised a large influence throughout the Soviet Union.

First Secretaries

See also
Kyiv Regional Committee of the Communist Party of Ukraine

Notes

Sources
 World Statesmen.org

Ukrainian Soviet Socialist Republic
History of Kyiv
City Committees of the Communist Party of Ukraine (Soviet Union)
1921 establishments in Russia
1991 disestablishments in the Soviet Union